Rea Carey (born December 22, 1966) is an American lesbian, gay, bisexual and transgender (LGBT) rights activist and served as the executive director of the National LGBTQ Task Force (previously the National Gay and Lesbian Task Force) from 2008 to 2021. She previously served as the organization's deputy executive director and was the founding executive director of the National Youth Advocacy Coalition.

Personal
Carey grew up in Denver, Colorado, and came out at the age of 16, near the start of the HIV/AIDS epidemic in the United States, which prompted her early activism.

Carey graduated from Smith College in the 1980s and holds a Master of Public Administration degree from the John F. Kennedy School of Government at Harvard University.

She lives in Washington, DC, with her wife, Margaret Conway, and daughter.

Career

Carey began her career working extensively in HIV/AIDS prevention and in the LGBT community as one of the co-founders of Gay Men and Lesbians Opposing Violence and the founding executive director of the National Youth Advocacy Coalition. She also served as an advisor to major donors and foundations, and has served on the advisory boards for such wide-ranging publications as Teen People magazine and the Georgetown University Journal of Gender and the Law.

In 1999, The Advocate named Carey one of its "Best and Brightest" for individual contributions to the LGBT rights movement.

Carey joined the National Gay and Lesbian Task Force in 2004 as deputy executive director, has served as executive director since 2008.

She was one of 105 women arrested on 2013 during an act of civil disobedience designed to pressure the United States House of Representatives to act on comprehensive immigration reform.

Carey serves on the advisory board of the LGBTQ Policy Journal of Harvard's Kennedy School of Government.

See also
 National Gay and Lesbian Task Force
 National Youth Advocacy Coalition

References

External links
National Gay and Lesbian Task Force

Living people
American LGBT rights activists
Place of birth missing (living people)
1966 births
Harvard Kennedy School alumni
Smith College alumni
LGBT people from Colorado